Rigo Walled Park is a neighborhood-named urban open space located on National Park Service property south of New York Avenue at L Street, NW in the Mount Vernon Square neighborhood of Washington, D.C. It is administered as part of the National Mall and Memorial Parks.

History

The land for Rigo Walled Park was a triangle formed by the original plan of Washington, D.C.  Acquired as public property pursuant to the Residence Act of 1790 and later transferred to the National Park Service it has remained public property since the founding of the District.

Facilities

Rigo Walled Park has no statues or monuments and no recreational facilities.  It consists of a fenced-in landscaped space and pedestrian walkways.

References

External links

Parks in Washington, D.C.
National Mall and Memorial Parks
Urban public parks